Neil King may refer to:

 Neil King (footballer) (1889–1955), Australian rules footballer
 Neil King (Canadian football) (born 1988), Canadian football defensive back
 Neil King (politician), Canadian politician